This is a list of defunct newspapers of Belgium.

 Le Communiste
 Écho de la Sambre
 Gazette van Ghendt
Ghendtsche Post-Tydinghen
Het Volk
L'Indépendance Belge
 La Libre Belgique (1940–44)
Nieuwe Tijdinghen
Le Pays Réel
Le Vingtième Siècle
La Voix des Belges
Volk en Staat
Het Vrije Woord

Belgium, defunct
Belgium